Battle of the Giants may refer to:

"Battle of the Giants!", a Christmas special of the TV series Dad's Army
Battle of the Giants (Fiji), an annual football competition in Fiji

See also
Combat of Giants, a video game series formerly called Battle of Giants in North America
Battle of the Titans (disambiguation)